Matt Maltese (born Matthew Jonathan Gordon Maltese) is a British-Canadian singer-songwriter. His style blends elements from indie pop, indie rock, and chamber pop. Since releasing his debut single "Even If It's a Lie" in 2015, Maltese has released three studio albums, and four EPs. In July 2021, Maltese announced his third studio album, Good Morning It's Now Tomorrow; the album was released in October 2021 via Nettwerk, the label he is currently signed with.

Early life 
Maltese was raised in Reading. According to an interview with Vice he started writing music at the age of 14. When he was a teenager Maltese began buying and selling vinyl and with the money he made, moved to Camden, London.

Career

2015–2017: SoundCloud and early singles 
Maltese released his first single, "Even If It's a Lie", on SoundCloud in 2015. After the release of the single, Maltese signed with Café Bleu Recordings, a subdivision of Atlantic Records. In 2016, through Café Bleu Recordings, Maltese released his follow up EP, titled In a New Bed. The following year in 2017 Maltese released a single titled "As the World Caves In" which as he shared in an interview, is about the idea of then-UK Prime Minister Theresa May and then-U.S. President Donald Trump, deciding to spend a night of romance together before triggering atomic warfare. The single saw a resurgence on TikTok starting in May 2021 following a cover by singer Sarah Cothran.  In January 2023, it was certified Silver in the UK by the British Phonographic Industry (BPI) for selling 200,000 equivalent units.

2018–2019: Bad Contestant and Krystal 
In June 2018 Maltese released his debut album, Bad Contestant. The album was produced by Jonathan Rado of American Indie rock duo Foxygen.

In November 2019 Maltese released Krystal. The album was mostly recorded, produced, and mixed by Maltese in his bedroom studio. With the release of Krystal, Maltese embarked on a UK headline tour in November 2019, he played on tour at six venues.

2020–2021: Madhouse and Good Morning It's Now Tomorrow 
In March 2020, Maltese released the single "Ballad of a Pandemic" about the COVID-19 pandemic; the single was released the same day as lockdown restrictions were imposed in the United Kingdom.

In May 2020, Maltese released "Queen Bee" featuring vocals from Sorry's Asha Lorenz.

In June 2020, Maltese took part in Tiny Gigs, a livestream event hosted by Tiny Changes, a mental health charity, to raise money for a COVID-19 relief fund.

In August 2020, Maltese released his extended play Madhouse.

In May 2021, Maltese released a single titled "Mystery" He then released another single in July 2021 called "Shoe" which was released following the announcement of Maltese's third studio album, Good Morning It's Now Tomorrow. The album was released in October, 2021.

2022-present: Quiet Recordings and Driving Just To Drive 
In March 2022 Maltese released a new song called "Smile In The Face Of The Devil" as a part of his new EP titled "Quiet Recordings". This EP would be a collection of more ambient tracks of off his previous album "Good Morning It's Now Tomorrow". "Quiet Recordings" was released on April 8th, 2022

In October 2022, Maltese released his new single "Mother". 

In December 2022, Maltese announced that his new album would be releasing in 2023. He then released a teaser for a new track followed by a single in January 2023 titled "Driving Just To Drive". The same day as this single was released Maltese announced his new album titled "Driving Just To Drive" would release on April 28th, 2023.

Discography

Studio albums

Extended plays

Singles

As lead artist 
Maltese has released the following singles:

As featured artist

Tours

Headlining act
 Matt Maltese EU + US Autumn Tour (2022)
(with special guest Sophie May, Hohnen Ford, Searows)

 Matt Maltese US 2022 TOUR

Supporting act
Wolf Alice UK and IRELAND TOUR (2022)

References

External links 

British indie rock musicians
British indie pop musicians
People from Camden Town
21st-century English singers
Singers from London
Living people
People from Reading, Berkshire
1995 births